Colin Daynes (born May 8, 1974) is a Canadian Greco-Roman wrestler who represented Canada at the 1996 Summer Olympics.

References

External links
 

1974 births
Brock Badgers wrestlers
Living people
Olympic wrestlers of Canada
Sportspeople from Windsor, Ontario
Wrestlers at the 1996 Summer Olympics
Canadian male sport wrestlers